Siraj Haider (6 February 1948 – 11 January 2018) was a Bangladeshi actor and director. He acted in over 400 films. He also directed two films. He acted in television, stage, radio and jatra too.

Biography
Haider was born on 6 February 1948 in Bikrampur, Munshiganj. He made his acting career debut with a drama titled Tipu Sultan in 1962. He was in class nine at that time.

Haider made his acting career debut in Dhallywood with Sukher Songsar. Besides films he also involved in acting in television, stage and jatra. He directed many stage dramas too. He founded Rangana Natyagoshthi in 1976.

Haider also directed two films. The name of these two films are Adom Byapari and Sukh. Of them Adom Bypari is an unrelated film. Mujib Pardeshi made his acting career debut with Sukh.

Haider was married to Mina Haider. They had two sons and one daughter.

Haider died on 11 January 2018 at his own home in Kalyanpur, Dhaka at the age of 69.

Selected filmography

Actor
 Sukher Songsar
 Top Terror
 Durdanto Dapot
 Ajker Protibad
 Protisruti
 Ananda Ashru
 Valobasar Ghor
 Gundar Prem
 Jibon Jekhane
 Ammajan
 Nirmom
 Bastob
 Mon Diyechhi Tomake
 Koti Takar Fokir
 Sukher Songsar
 Praner Cheye Priyo
 Khoka Sona
 Sujon Sokhi
 Pagol Mon
 Tumi Boro Vagyoboti
 Khude Joddha
 Priyangka
 Hajar Bachhor Dhore
 Moner Majhe Tumi
 Shotru Shotru Khela
 Eito Prem
 Koti Takar Prem
 Nishwartha Bhalobasa
 Kistimaat
 Mental
 Opomaner Jwala
 Crime Road
 Rudra The Gangster
 Kartuz
 Valobasa.com

Director
 Sukh
 Adom Byapari

References

External links
 

1948 births
2018 deaths
Bangladeshi film directors
Bangladeshi male television actors
Bangladeshi male film actors
Bangladeshi male stage actors
People from Munshiganj District
Bangladeshi theatre directors